Events in the year 1889 in Iceland.

Incumbents 

 Monarch: Christian IX
 Minister for Iceland: Johannes Nellemann

Events 

 Víðidalstungukirkja is constructed in Húnaþing vestra.

Births 

 9 February – Tryggvi Þórhallsson, prime minister of Iceland (1927–1932)
 26 December – Gunnfríður Jónsdóttir, sculptor

References 

 
1880s in Iceland
Years of the 19th century in Iceland
Iceland
Iceland